Tekkeh or Tekeh or Tokeh may refer to:
 Tekkeh, Hamadan
 Tekkeh, West Azerbaijan